Chrysocatharylla is a genus of moths of the family Crambidae.

Species
Chrysocatharylla agraphellus (Hampson, 1919)
Chrysocatharylla ceylonella (Bleszynski, 1964)
Chrysocatharylla gozmanyi Bassi, 1999
Chrysocatharylla lucasi (Schouten, 1994)
Chrysocatharylla oenescentellus (Hampson, 1896)

Former species
Chrysocatharylla fusca Bassi, 1999

References

 , 1999: Notes on Pseudocatharylla Bleszynski, 1961 (Lepidoptera: Crambidae: Crambinae) with a description of new genera and new species. Bollettino del Museo Regionale di Scienze Naturali Torino 16 (1–2): 151–188.

Crambidae genera